John Paczkowski (born August 10, 1969) is an American journalist and blogger who authored the technology blog Good Morning Silicon Valley for Knight Ridder and The San Jose Mercury News from 1999 to 2007. He's a graduate of Brown University.

Of Paczkowski, venture capitalist Paul Kedrosky said, "(he)  is quietly creating the most drily funny oeuvre of tech-related commentary anywhere. He is cheerfully adept at sticking in the knife, catching executives speaking sweet nothings, and generally providing much-needed context for the silliness that passes for Silicon Valley speak."

In January 2006, Paczkowski announced his retirement as Good Morning Silicon Valley's editor to take a position working with Wall Street Journal reporters Walt Mossberg and Kara Swisher on AllThingsD.com, an online extension of the duo's annual D: All Things Digital conference.

In May 2007, Paczkowski was incorrectly named as the anonymous author of the Fake Steve Jobs Blog –  a spoof diary of Apple's founder. The blog is actually authored by Daniel Lyons.

In February 2015, Paczkowski stepped down as deputy managing editor at Re/code to manage the San Francisco bureau of BuzzFeed News. He is currently the site's tech editor. Some of his crowning achievements during his time at Buzzfeed have been mentoring young reporters, editing stories that have won Pulitzers, and breaking important stories such as Uber’s sexual assault scandals and a Dog’s Review of the iPhone 11.

References

External links
 https://web.archive.org/web/20080311053646/http://svextra.com/blogs/gmsv/2007/02/good_memories_s.html
 http://www.paidcontent.org/entry/dow-jones-kara-swisher-and-walt-mossberg-launching-new/
 https://web.archive.org/web/20070811020246/http://valleywag.com/tech/rumormonger/steve-jobs-meet-steve-jobs-264251.php
 http://fakesteve.blogspot.com/2007/05/valleywag-is-obsessed-with-me.html
 https://web.archive.org/web/20080217232328/http://www.svextra.com/blogs/gmsv/
 http://digitaldaily.allthingsd.com/
 http://allthingsd.com/about/john-paczkowski
 https://web.archive.org/web/20141108023804/http://recode.net/column/code-red/

1969 births
Living people
American male journalists
American bloggers
All Things Digital people
BuzzFeed people
The Mercury News people
21st-century American non-fiction writers
American male bloggers